Garrett Lucash (born September 21, 1978, in Attleboro, Massachusetts) is an American pair skater. With partner Katie Orscher, he is the 2005 U.S. national champion and 2005 Four Continents bronze medalist.

Career 
Lucash was searching for a new partner when he remembered Orscher and gave her a call. Unlike most skaters, they both rotate clockwise. They trained in Simsbury, Connecticut.

In 2005, Orscher and Lucash won the gold medal at the U.S. Championships. They went on to win the bronze medal at the 2005 Four Continents Championships. At the 2005 Worlds, their placement combined with that of Rena Inoue / John Baldwin earned the United States two entries to the 2006 Winter Olympics.

In the summer of 2005, Orscher broke her foot, causing them to lose training time before the 2005–06 season. In January 2006 at the U.S Championships in St. Louis, Missouri, they were in first after the short program but dropped to third after the long program and missed the Olympic team by .66 points.

Orscher and Lucash announced their retirement from competitive skating in April 2006. Lucash is the co-creator and director of the National Figure Skating Academy in Boston, along with Dmitri Palamarchuk.

Personal life 
Lucash is a Boston Red Sox fan. On August 1, 2007, he was featured on the first episode of the Red Sox themed dating show Sox Appeal, in which he went on three blind dates at Fenway Park during a Red Sox game against the San Francisco Giants.

Programs 
(with Orscher)

Competitive highlights

With MacAdam

With Waldstein

With Orscher

References

External links

 National Figure Skating Academy - Boston

Navigation

1978 births
Living people
American male pair skaters
People from Attleboro, Massachusetts
Four Continents Figure Skating Championships medalists